Gagarawa is a Local Government Area in the north of Jigawa State, Nigeria. Its headquarters are in the town of Gagarawa.

It has an area of 654 km and a population of 80,394 at the 2006 census.

The postal code of the area is 732.

References

Local Government Areas in Jigawa State